Gouldsboro is a town and municipality in Hancock County, Maine, United States on the Schoodic Peninsula. The town was named for Robert Gould, a landholder in the town. The town has many historically separate fishing villages, summer colonies and communities, including Birch Harbor, Prospect Harbor, South Gouldsboro, West Gouldsboro, Summer Harbor, Wonsqueak Harbor, Bunker's Harbor, Chicken Mill, Jones' Pond, Westbay, and Corea.   The population was 1,703 at the 2020 census.

Geography

Demographics

2010 census
As of the census of 2010, there were 1,737 people, 773 households, and 528 families living in the town. The racial makeup of the town was 97.8% White, 0.2% African American, 0.3% Native American, 0.2% Asian, 0.1% Pacific Islander, 0.8% from other races, and 0.6% from two or more races. Hispanic or Latino of any race were 2.4% of the population.

There were 773 households, of which 21.6% had children under the age of 18 living with them, 56.0% were married couples living together, 7.8% had a female householder with no husband present, 4.5% had a male householder with no wife present, and 31.7% were non-families. 26.3% of all households were made up of individuals, and 12.7% had someone living alone who was 65 years of age or older. The average household size was 2.25 and the average family size was 2.66.

The median age in the town was 50.3 years. 17.2% of residents were under the age of 18; 6.1% were between the ages of 18 and 24; 18.4% were from 25 to 44; 35.1% were from 45 to 64; and 23.1% were 65 years of age or older. The gender makeup of the town was 50.3% male and 49.7% female.

2000 census
As of the census of 2000, there were 1,941 people, 801 households, and 539 families living in the town. The racial makeup of the town was 96.39% White, 0.67% African American, 0.82% Native American, 0.21% Asian, 0.26% Pacific Islander, 0.52% from other races, and 1.13% from two or more races. Hispanic or Latino of any race were 1.85% of the population.

There were 801 households, out of which 25.0% had children under the age of 18 living with them, 58.8% were married couples living together, 5.5% had a female householder with no husband present, and 32.7% were non-families. 27.5% of all households were made up of individuals, and 13.4% had someone living alone who was 65 years of age or older. The average household size was 2.31 and the average family size was 2.78.

In the town, the population was spread out, with 19.8% under the age of 18, 7.5% from 18 to 24, 26.7% from 25 to 44, 28.6% from 45 to 64, and 17.3% who were 65 years of age or older. The median age was 42 years. For every 100 females, there were 106.7 males. For every 100 females age 18 and over, there were 100.0 males.

The median income for a household in the town was $36,542, and the median income for a family was $43,864. Males had a median income of $25,076 versus $19,563 for females. The per capita income for the town was $18,203. About 7.0% of families and 10.4% of the population were below the poverty line, including 14.9% of those under age 18 and 8.5% of those age 65 or over.

Corea
Corea is one of the many villages that comprise the town of Gouldsboro. In the early 1800s, Corea was referred to as Indian Harbor, as it was occupied by the Native American Passamaquoddy. The name of the town changed from Indian Harbor to Corea in the year 1896 with the construction of the village's first post office. The primary industry of Corea is lobster fishing.

Notable people 

 Amy Clampitt, poet, author
 General David Cobb, congressman and Lieutenant Governor for Massachusetts
 Luere B. Deasy, Maine Senate President and State Supreme Court Justice
 Marsden Hartley, painter and poet
 Louis A. Meyer, author, artist
 Louise Dickinson Rich, writer

References

Further reading
 
 Rich, Louise Dickinson. The Peninsula. J.B. Lippincott Co. 1958.
 Johnson, Muriel Sampson. Early families of Gouldsboro, Maine. Picton Press, 1990.

External links
 Official website

Towns in Hancock County, Maine
Towns in Maine
Populated coastal places in Maine